An Eskimo kiss, nose kiss, or nose rub is the act of pressing or rubbing the tip of one's nose against another's cheek. The original term in Inuit languages for the action of rubbing one's nose against another's cheek is kunik. The kunik version of the nose-kiss is found in other cultures.

History
When early Western explorers of the Arctic first witnessed Inuit nose rubbing as a greeting behavior, they dubbed it Eskimo kissing, despite the practice's prevalence in nearby non-Eskimo cultures. This was used as an intimate greeting by the Inuit who, when they meet outside, often have little except their nose and eyes exposed.

In Inuit culture

Among the Inuit, kunik is a form of expressing affection, usually between family members and loved ones or to young children, that involves pressing the nose and upper lip against the skin (commonly of the cheeks or forehead) and breathing in, causing the loved one's skin or hair to be suctioned against the nose and upper lip. A common misconception is that the practice arose so that Inuit could kiss without their mouths freezing together. Rather, it is a non-erotic but intimate greeting used by people who, when they meet outside, often have little except their nose and eyes exposed.

The greeting was described in reports of Kerlungner and Wearner, part of a group of Alaskan Native people touring the United States with entrepreneur Miner W. Bruce in the 1890s: "Mr. Bruce yesterday instructed Kerlungner and Wearner that in this country they should not rub noses, and to close the lesson the two young women kissed each other in the new style for a beginning, both seeming to fear that they looked silly as they did it."

In other cultures
Other peoples use similar greeting practices, notably the Māori of New Zealand and Hawaiians, who practice the hongi and honi greetings, respectively. Mongolian nomads of the Gobi Desert have a similar practice, as do certain Southeast Asian cultures, such as Bengalis, Khmer people, Lao people, Thai people, Vietnamese people, Timor, Savu people, Sumba people and Iban people. Nose kissing is also employed as a traditional greeting by Arab tribesmen when greeting members of the same tribe. It is also popular in Arabian tribes in southern part of Iran, such as the Bushehr Province.

See also

 Cheek kissing

References

Kissing
Inuit culture
Gestures